AIF, A.I.F., AiF or aif may refer to:

Arts, entertainment and media
 Argumenty i Fakty (AiF), a Russian newspaper
 Australians in Film (AiF), a Los Angeles-based organisation for the promotion of Australian actors and filmmakers
Aspen Ideas Festival, an annual event in U.S.

Business and organizations
American India Foundation, a nonprofit American organization
The American Ireland Fund, an American charity
Amsterdam Institute of Finance, a Dutch financial training institute
Asian Institute of Finance, a nonprofit Malaysian financial organization
Association internationale des femmes, a former feminist organization
Atlantic Innovation Fund, a funding program of the Atlantic Canada Opportunities Agency
Atomic Industrial Forum, a former industrial policy organization
 Australians in Film (AiF), a Los Angeles-based organisation for the promotion of Australian actors and filmmakers
Financial Information Authority (Vatican City), (Autorità di Informazione Finanziaria)

Military
First Australian Imperial Force, an expeditionary force during World War I
Second Australian Imperial Force, an expeditionary force during World War II

Science and technology
Apoptosis-inducing factor, a flavoprotein
Arm Image Format, an object code format in computer programming
.aif, the Audio Interchange File Format
Author Impact Factor, an author-level metric

Sports
American Indoor Football, a former professional indoor football league
Arbeidernes Idrettsforbund ("Workers' Federation of Sports"), a former Norwegian sporting organization
Several Swedish sports clubs have AIF in the title: see

Other uses
Alternative investment fund
Argument Interchange Format, a means of exchanging argument resources between research groups

See also
ÅIF (disambiguation)